Cora Hilda Blanche Wilding  (15 November 1888 – 8 October 1982) was a New Zealand physiotherapist and artist, best remembered for her advocacy of outdoor activities and children’s health camps in the 1930s. She was instrumental in the founding of The Sunlight League in 1930, for which she held fundraising garden parties at "Fownhope", the Wilding family home in St Martins, Christchurch, and also the Youth Hostel Association of New Zealand in 1932. She had trained as a physiotherapist in Dunedin during World War I, and been introduced to youth hostels during her extensive European travels in the 1920s when she painted and studied outdoor activities.

Wilding was born in Christchurch, the son of Frederick and Julia Wilding, and a sister of tennis player Tony Wilding. Her indulgent father was a lawyer, and an athlete and cricket and tennis player. She was educated at Nelson College for Girls, where she was captain of the hockey team and school tennis champion.

She retired as a physiotherapist in 1948, and moved from Christchurch to Kaikoura, where she painted for many years. She was made a patron of the Youth Hostel Association of New Zealand in 1938 and a life member in 1968. In the 1952 New Year Honours, she was appointed a Member of the Order of the British Empire for services to the community. The first Christchurch youth hostel (1965–1997), formerly Avebury House the Flesher home, was called the "Cora Wilding Youth Hostel" in her honour.

References 
 
Cora and Co: The first half-century of New Zealand youth hostelling by Dion Crooks (1982, Youth Hostel Association of New Zealand)

External links 
Cora Wilding in the Dictionary of New Zealand Biography

1888 births
1982 deaths
New Zealand artists
New Zealand activists
New Zealand women activists
New Zealand physiotherapists
People from Christchurch
People from Kaikōura
New Zealand Members of the Order of the British Empire
People educated at Nelson College for Girls
People associated with The Group (New Zealand art)